The 2007–08 Phoenix Suns season was their 40th season in the National Basketball Association (NBA). The season was seen as the end of the "Seven Seconds or Less" era, after four-time All-Star Shawn Marion was traded midseason to the Miami Heat for big man Shaquille O'Neal. The Suns failed to advance past the first round of the playoffs for the first time since re-signing Steve Nash in 2004, losing to the defending NBA champion San Antonio Spurs in five games in the First Round, which led to the departure of head coach Mike D'Antoni. The Suns had the second best team offensive rating in the NBA.

Offseason
Forward Shawn Marion was set to earn $36 million over the next two seasons, putting the Suns over the salary cap next season and fueling speculations that he, one of the key Suns, may be traded during the offseason.

On June 6, former TNT analyst and NBA three-point specialist Steve Kerr was appointed Suns' General Manager and President of Basketball Operations. Kerr is close to team owner Robert Sarver and University of Arizona head men's basketball coach Lute Olson (Kerr's college coach); Kerr was also a part of the Sarver-led investment group that purchased the franchise from Jerry Colangelo.

On June 28, 2007, Spanish guard Rudy Fernández was taken 24th overall in the 2007 NBA Draft by the Suns, who subsequently traded the rights to the pick to the Portland Trail Blazers for cash. SF Alando Tucker of Wisconsin was taken with the 29th pick.

On July 5, 2007, the Suns came to an agreement with former Orlando Magic SF Grant Hill on a one-year $1.8 million deal with a player option for a second season at $2 million. In August 2007, Hill and his wife, R&B vocalist Tamia, purchased a home worth $3.78 million in the exclusive upscale community of Paradise Valley, adjacent to Scottsdale and home to several prominent local residents, including many star players for the Suns, Diamondbacks and the other local sports franchises.

On August 27, Maryland guard D. J. Strawberry (son of former Major League Baseball star Darryl Strawberry) signed a two-year contract with the Suns that included a guaranteed first year and a team option for the second season. Strawberry was drafted with the 59th selection in the second round of the 2007 NBA Draft; in the 2007 NBA Summer League he averaged a league-best 6.4 assists.

NBA draft

Season
The Suns won at least 50 games for the fourth straight season and faced the defending champion San Antonio Spurs in the playoffs for the third time in four years. Even with the presence of Shaquille O'Neal who was traded to the team just before the All-Star break for Shawn Marion, the Suns were yet again eliminated, this time in five games. Just days after the loss Steve Kerr allowed Mike D'Antoni to pursue coaching positions elsewhere and he was subsequently signed as the head coach of the New York Knicks less than two weeks later.

Roster

Regular season

Standings

Record vs. opponents

Game log 

|- align="center" bgcolor="#bbffbb"
| 1 || 1 November 2007 || @Sonics || 106–99 || Amar'e Stoudemire (23) || Amar'e Stoudemire and Shawn Marion (11) ||Steve Nash (12) || 17,072 || 1–0
|- align="center" bgcolor="#ffcccc"
| 2 || 2 November 2007 || Lakers || 119–98 || Leandro Barbosa (23) || || || 18,422|| 1–1
|- align="center" bgcolor="#bbffbb"
| 3 || 4 November 2007 || Cavaliers || 92–103 || Steve Nash (30) || || || 18,422 || 2–1
|- align="center" bgcolor="#bbffbb"
| 4 || 6 November 2007 || @Bobcats || 115–83 || Three-way tie (16) || || || 12,408 || 3–1
|- align="center" bgcolor="#ffcccc"
| 5 || 7 November 2007 || @Hawks || 96–105 || Steve Nash (34) || || || 19,855 || 3–2
|- align="center" bgcolor="#bbffbb"
| 6 || 9 November 2007 || @Heat || 106–101 || Steve Nash (30) || || || 19,600 || 4–2
|- align="center" bgcolor="#bbffbb"
| 7 || 10 November 2007 || @Magic || 106–96 || Leandro Barbosa (39) || || || 17,519 || 5–2
|- align="center" bgcolor="#bbffbb"
| 8 || 13 November 2007 || Knicks || 102–113 || Amar'e Stoudemire (26) || || || 18,422 || 6–2
|- align="center" bgcolor="#bbffbb"
| 9 || 15 November 2007 || Bulls || 102–112 || Leandro Barbosa (25) || || || 18,422 || 7–2
|- align="center" bgcolor="#bbffbb"
| 10 || 17 November 2007 || @Rockets || 115–105 || Two-way tie (21) || || || 18,265 || 8–2
|- align="center" bgcolor="#bbffbb"
| 11 || 20 November 2007 || @Kings || 100–98 || Amar'e Stoudemire (26) || ||  || 13,592 || 9–2
|- align="center" bgcolor="#bbffbb"
| 12 || 21 November 2007 || @Kings || 111–127 || Shawn Marion (25) || || || 18,422 || 10–2
|- align="center" bgcolor="#bbffbb"
| 13 || 23 November 2007 || Clippers || 94–113 || Amar'e Stoudemire (29) || || || 18,422 || 11–2
|- align="center" bgcolor="#ffcccc"
| 14 || 26 November 2007 || @Warriors || 114–129 || Steve Nash (23) || || || 19,596 || 11–3
|- align="center" bgcolor="#ffcccc"
| 15 || 28 November 2007 || Rockets || 100–94|| Steve Nash (29) || || || 18,422 || 11–4
|- align="center" bgcolor="#bbffbb"
| 16 || 30 November 2007 || Magic || 106–110 || Raja Bell (20) || || || 18,422 || 12–4

|- align="center" bgcolor="#bbffbb"
| 17 || 2 December 2007 || @Knicks || 115–104 || Two-way tie (28) || || || 18,869 || 13–4
|- align="center" bgcolor="#bbffbb"
| 18 || 4 December 2007 || @Pacers || 121–117 || Amar'e Stoudemire (42) || || || 11,435 || 14–4
|- align="center" bgcolor="#bbffbb"
| 19 || 5 December 2007 || @Raptors || 136–123 || Leandro Barbosa (35) || || || 19,800 || 15–4
|- align="center" bgcolor="#bbffbb"
| 20 || 7 December 2007 || @Wizards || 122–107 || Amar'e Stoudemire (27) || || || 20,173 || 16–4
|- align="center" bgcolor="#ffcccc"
| 21 || 8 December 2007 || @Timberwolves || 93–100 || Shawn Marion (18) || || || 19,356 || 16–5
|- align="center" bgcolor="#ffcccc"
| 22 || 10 December 2007 || Heat || 117–113 || Four-way tie (19) || || || 18,422 || 16–6
|- align="center" bgcolor="#bbffbb"
| 23 || 12 December 2007 || Jazz || 98–103 || Steve Nash (29) || || || 18,422 || 17–6
|- align="center" bgcolor="#ffcccc"
| 24 || 15 December 2007 || @Hornets || 98–101 || Leandro Barbosa (19) || || || 13,705 || 17–7
|- align="center" bgcolor="#bbffbb"
| 25 || 17 December 2007 || @Spurs || 100–95 || Grant Hill (22) || || || 18,797 || 18–7
|- align="center" bgcolor="#ffcccc"
| 26 || 19 December 2007 || @Mavericks || 105–108 || Amar'e Stoudemire (25) || || || 20,316 || 18–8
|- align="center" bgcolor="#bbffbb"
| 27 || 22 December 2007 || Raptors || 103–122 || Leandro Barbosa (31) || || || 18,422|| 19–8
|- align="center" bgcolor="#ffcccc"
| 28 || 25 December 2007 || @Lakers || 115–122 || Steve Nash (24) || || || 18,997 || 19–9
|- align="center" bgcolor="#bbffbb"
| 29 || 27 December 2007 || @Clippers || 108–88 || Amar'e Stoudemire (30) || || || 17,871 || 20–9
|- align="center" bgcolor="#bbffbb"
| 30 || 28 December 2007 || Clippers || 88–94 || Amar'e Stoudemire (28) || || || 18,422 || 21–9
|- align="center" bgcolor="#bbffbb"
| 31 || 30 December 2007 || @Kings || 117–102 || Amar'e Stoudemire (31) || || || 15,962 || 22–9

|- align="center"  bgcolor="#dddddd"
| # || Date || Visitor || Score || Home || OT || Leading scorer || Attendance || Record
|- align="center" bgcolor="#bbffbb"
| 32 || 3 January 2008 || SuperSonics || 96–104 || Suns || NA || Amar'e Stoudemire (34) || 18,422 || 23–9
|- align="center" bgcolor="#ffcccc"
| 33 || 5 January 2008 || Hornets || 118–113 || Suns || NA || Leandro Barbosa (28) || 18,422 || 23–10
|- align="center" bgcolor="#bbffbb"
| 34 || 7 January 2008 || Nuggets || 115–137 || Suns || NA || Shawn Marion (27) || 18,422 || 24–10
|- align="center" bgcolor="#bbffbb"
| 35 || 9 January 2008 || Pacers || 122–129 || Suns || 1 || Two-way tie (27) || 18,422 || 25–10
|- align="center" bgcolor="#ffcccc"
| 36 || 10 January 2008 || Suns || 86–108 || Jazz || NA || Leandro Barbosa (25) || 19,911 || 25–11
|- align="center" bgcolor="#bbffbb"
| 37 || 12 January 2008 || Bucks || 114–122 || Suns || NA || Steve Nash (35) || 18,422 || 26–11
|- align="center" bgcolor="#ffcccc"
| 38 || 15 January 2008 || Suns || 90–97 || Clippers || NA || Amar'e Stoudemire (29) || 16,063 || 26–12
|- align="center" bgcolor="#bbffbb"
| 39 || 17 January 2008 || Suns || 106–98 || Lakers || NA || Leandro Barbosa (22) || 18,997 || 27–12
|- align="center" bgcolor="#bbffbb"
| 40 || 18 January 2008 || Timberwolves || 95–115 || Suns || NA || Amar'e Stoudemire (23) || 18,422 || 28–12
|- align="center" bgcolor="#bbffbb"
| 41 || 20 January 2008 || Nets || 92–116 || Suns || NA || Amar'e Stoudemire (28) || 18,422 || 29–12
|- align="center" bgcolor="#bbffbb"
| 42 || 22 January 2008 || Suns || 114–105 || Bucks || NA || Steve Nash (37) || 14,503 || 30–12
|- align="center" bgcolor="#ffcccc"
| 43 || 23 January 2008 || Suns || 107–117 || Timberwolves || NA || Amar'e Stoudemire (33) || 15,101 || 30–13
|- align="center" bgcolor="#bbffbb"
| 44 || 25 January 2008 || Suns || 110–108 || Cavaliers || NA || Raja Bell (27) || 20,562 || 31–13
|- align="center" bgcolor="#bbffbb"
| 45 || 27 January 2008 || Suns || 88–77 || Bulls || NA || Amar'e Stoudemire (24) || 22,245 || 32–13
|- align="center" bgcolor="#bbffbb"
| 46 || 29 January 2008 || Hawks || 92–125 || Suns || NA || Amar'e Stoudemire (24) || 18,422 || 33–13
|- align="center" bgcolor="#ffcccc"
| 47 || 31 January 2008 || Spurs || 84–81 || Suns || NA || Shawn Marion (21) || 18,422 || 33–14

|- align="center"  bgcolor="#dddddd"
| # || Date || Visitor || Score || Home || OT || Leading scorer || Attendance || Record
|- align="center" bgcolor="#bbffbb"
| 48 || 4 February 2008 || Bobcats || 104–118 || Suns || NA || Leandro Barbosa (30) || 18,422 || 34–14
|- align="center" bgcolor="#ffcccc"
| 49 || 6 February 2008 || Hornets || 132–130 || Suns || 2 || Steve Nash (32) || 18,422 || 34–15
|- align="center" bgcolor="#bbffbb"
| 50 || 8 February 2008 || SuperSonics || 99–103 || Suns || NA || Amar'e Stoudemire (33) || 18,422 || 35–15
|- align="center" bgcolor="#bbffbb"
| 51 || 10 February 2008 || Wizards || 107–108 || Suns || NA || Amar'e Stoudemire (31) || 18,422 || 36–15
|- align="center" bgcolor="#ffcccc"
| 52 || 13 February 2008 || Suns || 118–120 || Warriors || NA || Amar'e Stoudemire (29) || 19,754 || 36–16
|- align="center" bgcolor="#bbffbb"
| 53 || 14 February 2008 || Mavericks || 97–109 || Suns || NA || Two-way tie (26) || 18,422 || 37–16
|- align="center" bgcolor="#ffcccc"
| 54 || 20 February 2008 || Lakers || 130–124 || Suns || NA || Amar'e Stoudemire (37) || 18,422 || 37–17
|- align="center" bgcolor="#bbffbb"
| 55 || 22 February 2008 || Celtics || 77–85 || Suns || NA || Amar'e Stoudemire (28) || 18,422 || 38–17
|- align="center" bgcolor="#ffcccc"
| 56 || 24 February 2008 || Pistons || 116–86 || Suns || NA || Amar'e Stoudemire (31) || 18,422 || 38–18
|- align="center" bgcolor="#bbffbb"
| 57 || 26 February 2008 || Suns || 127–113 || Grizzlies || NA || Two-way tie (25) || 13,482 || 39–18
|- align="center" bgcolor="#ffcccc"
| 58 || 27 February 2008 || Suns || 103–120 || Hornets || NA || Amar'e Stoudemire (32) || 17,931  || 39–19

|- align="center"  bgcolor="#dddddd"
| # || Date || Visitor || Score || Home || OT || Leading scorer || Attendance || Record
|- align="center" bgcolor="#ffcccc"
| 59 || 1 March 2008 || Sixers || 119–114 || Suns || NA || Amar'e Stoudemire (26) || 18,422  || 39–20
|- align="center" bgcolor="#bbffbb"
| 60 || 4 March 2008 || Suns || 97–92 || Trail Blazers || NA || Amar'e Stoudemire (22) || 20,595 || 40–20
|- align="center" bgcolor="#ffcccc"
| 61 || 5 March 2008 || Suns || 113–126 || Nuggets || NA || Amar'e Stoudemire (22) || 18,383 || 40–21
|- align="center" bgcolor="#ffcccc"
| 62 || 7 March 2008 || Jazz || 126–118 || Suns || NA || Amar'e Stoudemire (37) || 18,422 || 40–22
|- align="center" bgcolor="#bbffbb"
| 63 || 9 March 2008 || Spurs || 87–94 || Suns || NA || Steve Nash (19) || 18,422 || 41–22
|- align="center" bgcolor="#bbffbb"
| 64 || 12 March 2008 || Grizzlies || 111–132 || Suns || NA || Amar'e Stoudemire (29) || 18,422 || 42–22
|- align="center" bgcolor="#bbffbb"
| 65 || 13 March 2008 || Warriors || 115–123 || Suns || NA || Amar'e Stoudemire (36) || 18,422 || 43–22
|- align="center" bgcolor="#bbffbb"
| 66 || 15 March 2008 || Kings || 99–127 || Suns || NA || Amar'e Stoudemire (30) || 18,422 || 44–22
|- align="center" bgcolor="#bbffbb"
| 67 || 18 March 2008 || Suns || 111–98 || Trail Blazers || NA || Amar'e Stoudemire (25) || 20,580 || 45–22
|- align="center" bgcolor="#bbffbb"
| 68 || 19 March 2008 || Suns || 110–98 || Sonics || NA || Amar'e Stoudemire (26) || 17,072 || 46–22
|- align="center" bgcolor="#bbffbb"
| 69 || 22 March 2008 || Rockets || 113–122 || Suns || NA || Amar'e Stoudemire (38) || 18,422 || 47–22
|- align="center" bgcolor="#ffcccc"
| 70 || 24 March 2008 || Suns || 105–110 || Pistons || 1 || Amar'e Stoudemire (33) || 22,076 || 47–23
|- align="center" bgcolor="#ffcccc"
| 71 || 26 March 2008 || Suns || 97–117 || Celtics || NA || Amar'e Stoudemire (32) || 18,624 || 47–24
|- align="center" bgcolor="#bbffbb"
| 72 || 28 March 2008 || Suns || 107–93 || Sixers || NA || Amar'e Stoudemire (22) || 20,707 || 48–24
|- align="center" bgcolor="#bbffbb"
| 73 || 29 March 2008 || Suns || 110–104 || Nets || NA || Amar'e Stoudemire (33) || 19,990 || 49–24
|- align="center" bgcolor="#bbffbb"
| 74 || 31 March 2008 || Nuggets || 117–132 || Suns || NA || Amar'e Stoudemire (41) || 18,422 || 50–24

|- align="center" bgcolor="#ffcccc"
| 75 || 1 April 2008 || @Nuggets || 120–126 || Leandro Barbosa (27) || || || 18,870 || 50–25
|- align="center" bgcolor="#bbffbb"
| 76 || 4 April 2008 || Timberwolves || 88–117 || Amar'e Stoudemire (24) || ||  || 18,422 || 51–25
|- align="center" bgcolor="#ffcccc"
| 77 || 6 April 2008 || Mavericks || 105–98 || Amar'e Stoudemire (31) || ||  || 18,422 || 51–26
|- align="center" bgcolor="#bbffbb"
| 78 || 8 April 2008 || @Grizzlies || 127–113 || Amar'e Stoudemire (28) || ||  || 13,987 || 52–26
|- align="center" bgcolor= "#bbffbb"
| 79 || 9 April 2008 || @Spurs || 96–79 || Amar'e Stoudemire (21) || ||  || 18,797 || 53–26
|- align="center" bgcolor= "#ffcccc"
| 80 || 11 April 2008 || @Rockets || 90–101 || Amar'e Stoudemire (37) || ||  || 18,489 || 53–27
|- align="center" bgcolor= "#bbffbb"
| 81 || 14 April 2008 || Warriors || 116–122 || Amar'e Stoudemire (28) || ||  || 18,422 || 54–27
|- align="center" bgcolor= "#bbffbb"
| 82 || 16 April 2008 || Trail Blazers || 91–100 || Gordon Giricek (17) || ||  || 18,422 || 55–27

|}

Playoffs

|- bgcolor="#ffcccc"
| 1
| April 19
| @ San Antonio
| L 115–117 (2OT)
| Amar'e Stoudemire (33)
| Leandro Barbosa (8)
| Steve Nash (13)
| AT&T Center18,797
| 0–1
|- bgcolor="#ffcccc"
| 2
| April 22
| @ San Antonio
| L 96–102
| Amar'e Stoudemire (33)
| Shaquille O'Neal (14)
| Steve Nash (10)
| AT&T Center18,797
| 0–2
|- bgcolor="#ffcccc"
| 3
| April 25
| San Antonio
| L 99–115
| Amar'e Stoudemire (28)
| Amar'e Stoudemire (11)
| Steve Nash (9)
| US Airways Center18,422
| 0–3
|- bgcolor="#ccffcc"
| 4
| April 27
| San Antonio
| W 105–86
| Raja Bell (27)
| Shaquille O'Neal (12)
| Boris Diaw (8)
| US Airways Center18,422
| 1–3
|- bgcolor="#ffcccc"
| 5
| April 29
| @ San Antonio
| L 87–92
| Boris Diaw (22)
| Amar'e Stoudemire (11)
| Boris Diaw (8)
| AT&T Center18,797
| 1–4
|-

|-
! colspan=2 style="color:#FF8800" | 2008 playoff schedule
|}

Player statistics

Season

|- align="center" bgcolor=""
| * || 24 || 1 || 12.9 || .404 || .385 || .750 || 0.8 || 1.0 || .3 || .3 || 5.2
|- align="center" bgcolor="#f0f0f0"
|  || style="background:#FF8800;color:#423189;" | 82 || 12 || 29.5 || .462 || .389 || .822 || 2.8 || 2.6 || .9 || .2 || 15.6
|- align="center" bgcolor=""
|  || 75 || 75 || style="background:#FF8800;color:#423189;" | 35.3+ || .421 || .401 || .868 || 3.7 || 2.2 || .7 || .4 || 11.9
|- align="center" bgcolor="#f0f0f0"
|  || style="background:#FF8800;color:#423189;" | 82 || 19 || 28.1 || .477 || .317 || .744 || 4.6 || 3.9 || .7 || .5 || 8.8
|- align="center" bgcolor=""
| * || 22 || 0 || 20.1 || .497 || .380 || .941# || 2.3 || 1.6 || .4 || .1 || 8.8
|- align="center" bgcolor="#f0f0f0"
|  || 70 || 68 || 31.7 || .503 || .317 || .867 || 5.0 || 2.9 || style="background:#FF8800;color:#423189;" | .9+ || .8 || 13.1
|- align="center" bgcolor=""
| * || 6 || 0 || 8.8 || .500 || .500^ || . || 2.2 || 0.5 || .0 || .2 || 2.5
|- align="center" bgcolor="#f0f0f0"
| * || 47 || 47 || 36.4+ || .526 || .347 || .713 || 9.9+ || 2.1 || 2.0+ || 1.5 || 15.8
|- align="center" bgcolor=""
|  || 19 || 0 || 6.8 || .535 || .250 || .632 || 1.9 || 0.2 || .2 || .5 || 3.1
|- align="center" bgcolor="#f0f0f0"
|  || 81 || style="background:#FF8800;color:#423189;" | 81 || 34.3 || .504 || style="background:#FF8800;color:#423189;" | .470^ || style="background:#FF8800;color:#423189;" | .906# || 3.5 || style="background:#FF8800;color:#423189;" | 11.1 || .7 || .1 || 16.9
|- align="center" bgcolor=""
| * || 28 || 28 || 28.7 || .611† || . || .513 || 10.6+ || 1.7 || .5 || 1.2 || 12.9
|- align="center" bgcolor="#f0f0f0"
|  || 16 || 0 || 7.1 || .364 || .423 || 1.000# || 0.8 || 0.6 || .0 || .1 || 2.4
|- align="center" bgcolor=""
|  || 66 || 0 || 12.8 || .465 || .667^ || .524 || 3.6 || 0.2 || .3 || 1.2 || 3.3
|- align="center" bgcolor="#f0f0f0"
|  || 79 || 79 || 33.9 || style="background:#FF8800;color:#423189;" | .590† || .161 || .805 || style="background:#FF8800;color:#423189;" | 9.1 || 1.5 || .8 || style="background:#FF8800;color:#423189;" | 2.1 || style="background:#FF8800;color:#423189;" | 25.2
|- align="center" bgcolor=""
|  || 33 || 0 || 8.2 || .315 || .240 || .474 || 0.8 || 0.9 || .4 || .2 || 2.2
|- align="center" bgcolor="#f0f0f0"
|  || 6 || 0 || 8.0 || .364 || .250 || .833 || 1.3 || 0.0 || .0 || .2 || 3.7
|}

* – Stats with the Suns.
+ – Minimum 70 games played or 2000 minutes, 800 rebounds, 125 steals.
† – Minimum 300 field goals made.
^ – Minimum 55 three-pointers made.
# – Minimum 125 free throws made.

Playoffs

|- align="center" bgcolor=""
|  || style="background:#FF8800;color:#423189;" | 5 || 1 || 28.6 || .345 || .222 || .909 || 4.0 || 1.8 || .6 || .0 || 10.4
|- align="center" bgcolor="#f0f0f0"
|  || style="background:#FF8800;color:#423189;" | 5 || style="background:#FF8800;color:#423189;" | 5 || style="background:#FF8800;color:#423189;" | 43.0 || style="background:#FF8800;color:#423189;" | .568 || style="background:#FF8800;color:#423189;" | .650 || .813 || 5.6 || 2.2 || .4 || .2 || 13.6
|- align="center" bgcolor=""
|  || style="background:#FF8800;color:#423189;" | 5 || 2 || 35.6 || .547 || .000 || .500 || 5.6 || 4.6 || .6 || .8 || 14.6
|- align="center" bgcolor="#f0f0f0"
|  || style="background:#FF8800;color:#423189;" | 5 || 0 || 16.0 || .333 || .250 || 1.000# || 1.4 || 0.4 || .4 || .0 || 3.4
|- align="center" bgcolor=""
|  || 3 || 2 || 22.7 || .455 || . || 1.000# || 5.3 || 1.0 || .7 || .3 || 3.7
|- align="center" bgcolor="#f0f0f0"
|  || 1 || 0 || 3.0 || . || . || . || 0.0 || 0.0 || .0 || .0 || 0.0
|- align="center" bgcolor=""
|  || style="background:#FF8800;color:#423189;" | 5 || style="background:#FF8800;color:#423189;" | 5 || 36.6 || .457 || .300 || style="background:#FF8800;color:#423189;" | .917# || 2.8 || style="background:#FF8800;color:#423189;" | 7.8 || .4 || .2 || 16.2
|- align="center" bgcolor="#f0f0f0"
|  || style="background:#FF8800;color:#423189;" | 5 || style="background:#FF8800;color:#423189;" | 5 || 30.0 || .440 || . || .500 || style="background:#FF8800;color:#423189;" | 9.2 || 1.0 || 1.0 || style="background:#FF8800;color:#423189;" | 2.6 || 15.2
|- align="center" bgcolor=""
|  || 1 || 0 || 2.0 || . || . || . || 0.0 || 0.0 || .0 || .0 || 0.0
|- align="center" bgcolor="#f0f0f0"
|  || 4 || 0 || 5.3 || .500 || . || .500 || 0.8 || 0.0 || .0 || .8 || 2.0
|- align="center" bgcolor=""
|  || style="background:#FF8800;color:#423189;" | 5 || style="background:#FF8800;color:#423189;" | 5 || 40.8 || .485 || .250 || .633 || 9.0 || 0.4 || style="background:#FF8800;color:#423189;" | 1.4 || 2.4 || style="background:#FF8800;color:#423189;" | 23.2
|- align="center" bgcolor="#f0f0f0"
|  || 1 || 0 || 5.0 || .000 || .000 || . || 1.0 || 0.0 || .0 || .0 || 0.0
|}

# – Minimum 10 free throws made.

Awards and records

Records

Milestones

Transactions
The Suns were involved in the following transactions during the 2007–08 season.

Trades

Free agents

See also
2007–08 NBA season

References

External links

Phoenix Suns seasons
2007–08 NBA season by team